The 1978 Penn State Nittany Lions football team represented the Pennsylvania State University in the 1978 NCAA Division I-A football season. The team was coached by Joe Paterno and played its home games in Beaver Stadium in University Park, Pennsylvania.

Schedule

Roster

Game summaries

Temple

Ohio State

Maryland

Syracuse

Chuck Fusina threw four touchdown passes, including two to Scott Fitzkee as second-ranked Penn State extended its win streak to 15 games. Fusina finished 15 of 27 for 293 yards.

Post season

NFL Draft
Nine Nittany Lions were drafted in the 1979 NFL Draft.

Awards

Bruce Clark
Lombardi Award
Chuck Fusina
Maxwell Award
Joe Paterno
Eddie Robinson Coach of the Year

References

Penn State
Penn State Nittany Lions football seasons
Lambert-Meadowlands Trophy seasons
Penn State Nittany Lions football